The West Coast Computer Faire was an annual computer industry conference and exposition most often associated with San Francisco, its first and most frequent venue. The first fair was held in 1977 and was organized by Jim Warren and Bob Reiling. At the time, it was the biggest computer show in the world, intended to popularize the personal computer in the home. The West Coast PC Faire was formed to provide a more specialized show. However, Apple Inc. stopped exhibiting at the West Coast Computer Faire, refusing to exhibit at any show other than COMDEX that also had PC-based exhibits.

In 1983, Warren sold the rights to the Faire for US$3 million to Prentice Hall, who later sold it to Sheldon Adelson, the owner of Interface Group and COMDEX. In total, sixteen shows were held, with the last in 1991. After Warren sold the show, it had a few more good years, and then declined rapidly.

History
The first fair took place on April 16–17, 1977, in San Francisco Civic Auditorium, and saw the debut of the Commodore PET, presented by Chuck Peddle, and the Apple II, presented by then-22-year-old Steve Jobs and 26-year-old Steve Wozniak. At the exhibition, Jobs introduced the Apple II to Japanese textile maker Toshio Mizushima, who became the first authorized Apple dealer in Japan.

Other visitors included Tomio Gotō who developed the TK-80 and PC-8001, and Kazuhiko Nishi who produced the MSX. There were about 180 exhibitors, among them Intel, MITS, and Digital Research.

When the first fair opened, almost twice as many people arrived as Warren anticipated, and thousands of people were waiting to get into the auditorium. More than 12,000 people visited the fair.

The 2nd West Coast Computer Faire was held March 3–5, 1978, at what was then the San Jose Convention Center (now Parkside Hall). This event had the first-ever microcomputer chess tournament, won by Sargon.

The 3rd West Coast Computer Faire was held on November 3–5, 1978, at the Los Angeles Convention Center.

The 4th West Coast Computer Faire returned to San Francisco in May 1979 at Brooks Hall and Civic Auditorium. Dan Bricklin demonstrated VisiCalc, the first spreadsheet program for personal computers.

At the 5th West Coast Computer Faire, held in March 1980, Microsoft announced their first hardware product, the Z-80 SoftCard, which gave the Apple II CP/M capabilities.

The 6th West Coast Computer Faire was held on April 3–5, 1981, notable for being the venue where Adam Osborne introduced the Osborne 1.

The 7th West Coast Computer Faire saw the introduction of the 5 MB Winchester disk drive for IBM PCs by Davong Systems. It was held on March 19–21, 1982, in San Francisco.  That year's conference also featured a Saturday breakout session, titled "THE IBM PERSONAL COMPUTER", with eight talks delivered in a three-hour period.  One of these was (as listed in the program):

 P.C. — It's Impact on the MicroComputer Industry 
 Bill Gates, President
 Microsoft
 10800 N.E. 8th #819
 Bellevue, WA 98004

At its peak, all available spaces for exhibits were rented out, including the balcony of Civic Auditorium, and the hallway to the restrooms in Brooks Hall (where Bob Wallace ("Quicksoft") introduced "PC-Write").

The 8th West Coast Computer Faire was held March 18–20, 1983.

Subsequent West Coast Computer Faires were held in Moscone Center in San Francisco. After the 10th Faire, Bruce Webster wrote that "Warren sold out just in time. The Faire is shrinking. It may not be dying, but it is no longer the important trade show it was two short years ago. Without the giant booths from IBM, Apple, and AT&T, the Faire would have looked like any other small, local, end-user show. The move to the Moscone Center didn't help that impression; a large chunk of the main floor was unused, adding to the impression of the Faire's shrunken size".

The 12th West Coast Computer Faire was held in March 1987.

The 16th West Coast Computer Faire was held from May 30 to June 2, 1991, at Moscone Center.

West Coast IBM PC Faire, SF 
First West Coast IBM PC Faire, August 26–28, 1983 in San Francisco, CA, was presented by Computer Faire, Inc., Redwood City, CA.

Personal Computer Faire, SF 
Third Personal Computer Faire September 5–7, 1985 in San Francisco, CA was presented by Computer Faire, Inc., Newton, MA.

Fourth Personal Computer Faire, in San Francisco, was presented September 25–27, 1986, by The Interface Group, Needham, Mass.

Northeast Computer Faire
The Northeast Computer Faire in Boston, was presented by Computer Faire Inc., Newton, Mass., a subsidiary of Prentice-Hall.

The Eighth Northeast Computer Faire, September 26–29, 1985, Bayside Exposition Center. Boston. MA. was presented by Computer Faire Inc., Newton, MA.

The 11th Northeast Computer Faire, which ran October 27-29, 1988, was presented by The Interface Group and Boston Computer Society in Boston.

Southern California Computer Faire
Southern California Computer Faire was presented by Computer Faire Inc., Newton, Mass., a subsidiary of Prentice-Hall.

References

Media coverage

External links
 Silicon Gulch Gazette
 Original article about the first fair by David H. Ahl in The Best of Creative Computing Volume 3 (1980)
 On the Edge: The Spectacular Rise and Fall of Commodore (2005) Variant Press. Mentions the WCCF and the debut of the Commodore PET and Apple II.

1977 establishments in California
1991 disestablishments in California
Annual events in California
Computer conferences
Computer-related introductions in 1977
Events in San Francisco
History of computing
Recurring events established in 1977
Recurring events disestablished in 1991